Michael Paul Bundra (June 24, 1939 - August 1, 2009) was a professional football player, drafted by the Detroit Lions in 1962. He played with the Lions for two seasons before playing for both the Minnesota Vikings (4 games) and the Cleveland Browns (9 games) in the 1964 season, which earned him an NFL championship ring when the Browns beat the Baltimore Colts 27-0.

He played for the New York Giants the next season, playing 9 games before retiring. In 48 total career games, he recovered 4 fumbles.

On August 1, 2009, Bundra died at age 70 in Maryville, Tennessee.

References

1939 births
2009 deaths
American football defensive tackles
Detroit Lions players
Minnesota Vikings players
Cleveland Browns players
New York Giants players
USC Trojans football players
Players of American football from Pennsylvania
Sportspeople from Northampton County, Pennsylvania
Catasauqua High School alumni